Azaleodes is a genus of moths of the family Palaephatidae. The genus is endemic to Australia.

Description
Azaleodes species have broad wings, which are golden brown with fine black spots in the male.

Distribution
Species are only known from rainforest from Wollongong in New South Wales to Cooktown in Queensland.

Species
Azaleodes brachyceros Nielsen, 1987 
Azaleodes fuscipes Nielsen, 1987 
Azaleodes megaceros Nielsen, 1987 
Azaleodes micronipha Turner, 1923

External links
Australian Faunal Directory
A Guide to Australian Moths

Moths of Australia
Palaephatidae
Monotrysia genera